¡Qué difícil es amar! is a 2018 Peruvian romantic comedy film written, directed and co-produced by David Ames in his directorial debut. Starring Milett Figueroa, Diego Bertie, Oscar López Arias and Valentín Prado.

Synopsis 
The film narrates the adventures of three friends in love, who have the particularity of living together as roommates, being of different ages; a twentysomething, a thirtysomething and a fortysomething.

Cast 
The actors include:

 Diego Bertie
 Milett Figueroa
 Oscar López Arias
 Valentín Prado
 Daniela Sarfati

Release 
The film was scheduled to be released on January 11, 2018, in Peruvian theaters, but the release was delayed until February 1 of the same year for marketing reasons.

References

External links 

 

2018 films
2018 romantic comedy films
Peruvian romantic comedy films
2010s Spanish-language films
2010s Peruvian films
Films set in Peru
Films shot in Peru
Films about friendship
2018 directorial debut films